Connors Lake is a lake in South Dakota, in the United States.

Connors Lake has the name of John Connors, a pioneer.

See also
List of lakes in South Dakota

References

Lakes of South Dakota
Bodies of water of Beadle County, South Dakota